Bartley Fahey (15 October 1836 – 9 August 1920) was member of the Queensland Legislative Council.

Early life
Fahey was born in New Quay, County Clare, Ireland to Peter Fahey and his wife Margaret Mary (née Manning). On his arrival in Australia he worked as a harbourmaster and water police magistrate in several towns across Queensland.

Political career
Fahey was called up to the Queensland Legislative Council in May 1904 and served until his death in August 1920.

Personal life
Fahey married Agnes Anne Corser in 1876, and together had three children.

He died in August 1920 and was buried in Toowong Cemetery.

References

Members of the Queensland Legislative Council
1836 births
1920 deaths
People from County Clare
Irish emigrants to colonial Australia
Burials at Toowong Cemetery